Ayesha Siddiqa 
(), (born April 7, 1966), is a Pakistani political scientist, a political commentator and an author who serves as a research associate at the SOAS South Asia Institute. She previously served as the inaugural Pakistan Fellow at the Woodrow Wilson Center between 2004 and 2005.

Biography
Born in Lahore, Siddiqa studied at Kinnaird College and went on to join the Civil Service of Pakistan. As a civil servant, Siddiqa served as the director of naval research with the Pakistan Navy, making her the first civilian and the first woman to work at that position in Pakistan's defence establishment. She also worked in military accounts and as deputy director Defense Services Audit. Siddiqa moved to London, where she received her PhD from King's College London in war studies. After leaving the civil service, she served as the senior research fellow at the Sandia National Laboratories and went on to teach at the University of Pennsylvania, Johns Hopkins University and the Quaid-e-Azam University. She also served as the Charles Wallace Fellow at St Antony's College, Oxford in 2015.

She has written extensively on the Pakistan military, and her research has covered issues varying from the Pakistan military's covert development of military technology, defensive game theory, nuclear deterrence, arms procurement and arms production, to civil-military relations in Pakistan. After leaving the bureaucracy, she authored Pakistan's Arms Procurement and Military Buildup, 1979-99: In Search of a Policy, 2001, and later, in 2007, published her critically acclaimed book: Military Inc.: Inside Pakistan's Military Economy. She also regularly writes critical columns for English language newspapers, including Dawn, Daily Times, The Friday Times and Express Tribune.

References

External links

 Soldiers of Fortune - by Ayesha Siddiqa

1966 births
Living people
Pakistani women journalists
Pakistani political scientists
Johns Hopkins University faculty
Pakistani military writers
Ayesha Siddiqa
Pakistani expatriates in the United Kingdom
Pakistani expatriates in the United States
Pakistani scholars
Alumni of King's College London
Peace and conflict scholars
Kinnaird College for Women University alumni
People from Islamabad
Women military writers
Pakistani scholars of Pakistan studies
Military theorists
Academic staff of Pakistan Naval War College
Pakistan Army civilians
Pakistan Navy civilians
Pakistani women columnists
Women political scientists